The Body is a 1970 British scientific documentary film directed and produced by Roy Battersby. In the film, external and internal cameras are used to showcase the human body.

The film's narrators, Frank Finlay and Vanessa Redgrave, provide commentary that combines the knowledge of human biologists and anatomical experts. The film's soundtrack, Music from the Body, was composed by Ron Geesin and Roger Waters, and includes songs that were made using the human body as a medium. Waters is also the narrator of one scene.

Production
The film was "suggested by" a science book by Anthony Smith. The cost of optioning film rights and developing the project to take to market cost £11,000 which came from the NFFC. After a year, by December 1969 Battersby had a script. He showed this to the NFFC which resulted in another draft of the script. The NFFC agreed to provide half of the finance. In March 1969 Battersby met with Nat Cohen at Anglo-Amalgamated who agreed to provide the other half of finance on that day. Battersby shot about 300,000 feet of film of which 11,000 were used. "There was a lot of blood and film on the cutting room floor," said Garnett.

Soundtrack
Tony Garnett asked John Peel recommendations for who might do the soundtrack. Peel suggested Ron Geesin. He did it with Roger Waters from Pink Floyd. Geesin later said:
It was an attempt... to put a deeply socio-human documentary about the human body into cinemas, using some then-pioneering micro-camera work: coursing along the various tubes and all that. The soundtrack did what all film soundtracks are supposed to do: duet with the visual content, for, against, unison, comment. The subsequent album for EMI consisted of most of that soundtrack, in its many parts: mine as originally recorded, Roger’s re-recorded, supplemented by two original tracks, little to do with the film and all to do with Roger and me having fun, ‘Our Song’ and ‘Body Transport’.

Reception
In August 1971 Nat Cohen, whose company distributed the film, said it had recouped its negative cost in the Far East alone.

Home media

The film was released on DVD on 7 October 2013.

References

External links

The Body at Letterboxd
The Body at BFI
Review of film at New York Times

1970 films
Documentary films about science
1970 documentary films
British documentary films
Metro-Goldwyn-Mayer films
1970s English-language films
1970s British films